Samil Beach is the principal beach of Vigo in Galicia in north-west Spain.

Located near the Cíes Islands, the mouth of the river Lagares is found at its west end. Several Vitrasa urban public transport lines connect it with different areas of the city. Those lines are: L10, C15A, C15B and C15C during the whole year, C3 during the summer, and the night lines CN1 and CN2.

Around Samil, several services have been created: museums (such as "Museo do Mar" and "Verbum"), several catering premises, clubs and cafés. Its promenade covers the littoral zone and it offers several leisure facilities (three public swimming pools, garden areas, basketball courts, a mini-soccer court, tennis and paddle courts, a skating rink, and terraces). 

Beaches of Galicia (Spain)